Gerald Wells may refer to:

 Gerry Wells (1929–2014), British radio enthusiast and collector
 Gerald Wells (Royal Navy officer) (died 1943)